Belel may refer to:
Belel, Cameroon
Belel, Nigeria
HD 181342, a red giant star